Hilde Schulz-Amelang (née Amelang; born 22 December 1937) is a retired East German rower who won seven European medals in rowing between 1959 and 1966, including two gold medals. After retiring from competitions she worked as a rowing referee, becoming in 1976 the world's third woman with the international referee license.

References

1938 births
Living people
East German female rowers
Rowers from Berlin
European Rowing Championships medalists